The Mellon Jazz Festival was a festival in Pittsburgh, Pennsylvania that was sponsored by Mellon Bank. Acts who performed at the festival included Ella Fitzgerald, Diana Krall, Sonny Rollins, and John Zorn. The event began under the name Pittsburgh Jazz Festival in 1964 and closed in 2003.

References

External links
Official website

Jazz festivals in the United States
Festivals in Pittsburgh
Music festivals in Pennsylvania
Recurring events established in 1964
Recurring events disestablished in 2003
1964 establishments in Pennsylvania
2003 disestablishments in Pennsylvania